The Alexander Nevsky Cathedral is a cathedral in Yalta, Crimea, built in 1902, and designed by Nikolay Krasnov.

See also
 Church of the Resurrection, Foros

References

External links

 Exterior shot of cathedral
 Pictures of Yalta, including both interior and exterior shots of the cathedral

Churches in Crimea
Buildings and structures in Yalta
Eastern Orthodox cathedrals in Ukraine
Churches completed in 1902
Tourist attractions in Crimea
Yalta
Cultural heritage monuments of regional significance in Crimea